The South Australia cricket team, officially named the West End Redbacks, is an Australian men's professional first-class cricket team based in Adelaide, South Australia. The Redbacks play their home matches at Adelaide Oval and are the state cricket team for South Australia, representing the state in the Sheffield Shield competition and the limited overs Marsh One-Day Cup. Their Marsh One-Day Cup uniform features a red body with black sleeves. They are known as the West End Redbacks due to a sponsorship agreement with West End. The Redbacks formerly competed in the now-defunct KFC Twenty20 Big Bash, but were succeeded by the Adelaide Strikers in 2011 because this league was replaced with the Big Bash League.

History

The earliest known first-class match played by South Australia took place against Tasmania on the Adelaide Oval in November 1877. In 1892–93, they joined New South Wales and Victoria and played the inaugural Sheffield Shield season. South Australia won the Shield in just their second attempt. They have won the competition 13 times in total while they have twice won the One Day tournament now known as the Ryobi One Day Cup. They are also the current holders of the KFC 20/20 Big Bash trophy, defeating NSW in the 2010/11 final at Adelaide Oval. They will continue to hold the KFC Twenty20 Big Bash trophy, as the league is now defunct and has been replaced by the Big Bash League.

Over the years, many successful international cricketers have played for South Australia.
Clarrie Grimmett played with them during the 1920s and '30s, taking a total of 668 wickets. This remains a state record. In 1934, Sir Donald Bradman moved to South Australia and joined the team after originally playing with New South Wales, and he started with scores of 117, 233 and 357 in his first three innings. Others include the Chappell brothers (Ian and Greg), David Hookes, Darren Lehmann, Gil Langley, Jason Gillespie, and Terry Jenner.

South Australia has also imported cricketers to play for them, with the most famous being Sir Gary Sobers, who appeared in three seasons during the early 1960s, and Barry Richards. Richards played just one season with South Australia but managed to set a state record for most runs in a season, making 1101 runs in the 1970–71 season.

Honours

Sheffield Shield (13)

 1893–94
 1909–10
 1912–13
 1926–27
 1935–36
 1938–39
 1952–53
 1963–64
 1968–69
 1970–71
 1975–76
 1981–82
 1995–96

One-day Cups (3)
 1983–84
 1986–87
 2011–12

KFC Twenty20 Big Bash/Big Bash League (1)
 2010–11

Squad

Players with international caps are listed in bold.

First-class records

Most runs for South Australia

Highest individual score:
 Don Bradman 369 vs Tasmania in 1935/36
Most centuries:
 Darren Lehmann 39
Most runs in a season:
 Michael Klinger 1203 runs in 2008/09
Highest partnership:
 David Hookes and Wayne Phillips 462* vs Tasmania in 1986/87
Highest team score:
 821-7d vs Queensland in 1939/40

Most wickets for South Australia

Most wickets in a season:
 Shaun Tait 65
Most wickets in an innings:
 Tim Wall 10/36 vs NSW in 1932/33
Most wickets in a match:
 George Giffen 17/201 vs Victoria in 1885/86

See also
List of South Australian representative cricketers

References

External links
 West End Redbacks
 A brief history of South Australia

Australian first-class cricket teams
Red
Cricket in South Australia
Cricket clubs established in 1887
1887 establishments in Australia